Keram may refer to:

Papua New Guinea
Keram Rural LLG, East Sepik Province
Keram languages
Keram River

People with the name
Keramuddin Keram (born 1956), Afghan politician
Keram Malicki-Sánchez (born 1974), Canadian actor and singer

See also